Hugo Rothstein (28 August 1810 Erfurt - 28 March 1865 Erfurt) was a Prussian officer, writer, educator and gymnast.  He traveled to Sweden to investigate Swedish gymnastics, and introduced it into Prussian military and civil physical training programs.  He was a severe critic of the Turners and their German system of gymnastics.

References

External links
 
 

1810 births
1865 deaths
19th-century German educators
Prussian Army personnel
German gymnasts
Military personnel from Erfurt
German male writers